Erul Heights (‘Erulski Vazvisheniya’ \e-'rul-ski v&z-vi-'she-ni-ya\) are the heights rising to 1083 m (Gigen Peak) on Trinity Peninsula in Graham Land, Antarctica.  They are bounded by Russell East Glacier to the south and Cugnot Ice Piedmont to the north, extending 8 km from Benz Pass in east-southeast direction towards Smokinya Cove, and surmounting Prince Gustav Channel, Weddell Sea to the southeast.

The heights are named after the settlement of Erul in Western Bulgaria.

Location

German-British mapping in 1996.

Maps
 Trinity Peninsula. Scale 1:250000 topographic map No. 5697. Institut für Angewandte Geodäsie and British Antarctic Survey, 1996.
 Antarctic Digital Database (ADD). Scale 1:250000 topographic map of Antarctica. Scientific Committee on Antarctic Research (SCAR). Since 1993, regularly updated.

References
 Erul Heights. SCAR Composite Antarctic Gazetteer
 Bulgarian Antarctic Gazetteer. Antarctic Place-names Commission. (details in Bulgarian, basic data in English)

External links
Erul Heights. Copernix satellite image

Mountains of Trinity Peninsula
Bulgaria and the Antarctic